Fires is a six-part Australian television drama series on ABC TV which first screened on 26 September 2021, set against the background of the 2019–20 Australian bushfire season.

Synopsis
Fires is an anthology series about the megafires which devastated Australia in 2019 and 2020, and captured the world's attention.

Cast

Production
The series was commissioned by the ABC Television network in August 2020.

Episodes

Release
The series aired on ABC TV from 26 September 2021. 

It aired on the CTV Drama Channel in Canada, and RTÉ 2 in Ireland.

Awards 

 2021: Winner, AACTA Award for Best Telefeature or Mini Series
 2022: Winner, Logie Award for Most Outstanding Miniseries or Telemovie

References

External links
 
 

2021 Australian television series debuts
2021 Australian television series endings
Australian Broadcasting Corporation original programming
English-language television shows
Television series by Universal Television
Television series by Matchbox Pictures
Television series created by Tony Ayres